Raptor Island is a Sci Fi original film about an island in the South China Sea. The film debuted on the Sci Fi Channel on August 21, 2004.

Plot
A team of SEALs chases a group of terrorists onto the island after destroying a weapons cache and rescuing a hostage special agent. While tracking the terrorists, mutated dinosaurs appear and the mission changes into simple survival. The dinosaurs use their skilled sense of smell and ability to swim to hunt down the SEALs and terrorists.

After losing several men to the raptors and killing some of the terrorists, the SEALs manage to rescue the female agent, Jamie, captured by the terrorists. She and the remaining SEALs discover a crash site of a Chinese airplane. Around the site are broken containers that had contained nuclear waste. The team figures the spilled waste caused the local animals to mutate into dinosaurs. The dinosaurs kill all the terrorists and SEALs except Azir, Jamie and the SEAL's leader. After encountering more mutant raptors, the last three SEALs and Jamie find refuge in a cave, which turns out to be the nest of the dinosaurs. In the end, Azir is killed by a mutated Carnotaurus and the island is destroyed as a result of volcanic activity. The last scene is of three raptors escaping the carnage, swimming after the rescue helicopter.

Cast
 Lorenzo Lamas as Hacket
 Steven Bauer as Azir
 Hayley DuMond as Jamie Cole
 Michael Cory Davis as Marcus
 Peter Jason as Captain
 Hristo Shopov as Quinn
 Atanas Srebrev as Simon
 Ivo Tonchev as Rico
 Michail Elenov as Kalif
 Yulian Vergov as Rashid
 Pavil Gavrilov as Yusef
 Velislav Pavlov as Hassan
 Dejan Angelov as Diaz

Sequel

Raptor Island was followed by the loosely related 2007 sequel Planet Raptor. Planet Raptor is set in the year 2066, when Earth's only occupants are raptors and marines. Planet Raptor is directed by Gary Jones and was filmed entirely in Romania.

Home media
Raptor Island was released on DVD on November 14, 2006 by Anchor Bay Entertainment.

Internet mobisodes
Mobisodes can be found on YouTube in twenty parts.

References

External links

2004 television films
2004 films
Films about dinosaurs
2004 science fiction films
Syfy original films
American science fiction action films
2004 action thriller films
Films set on islands
Films shot in Bulgaria
Action television films
American thriller television films
2000s English-language films
2000s American films